Temple Sowerby is a civil parish in the Eden District, Cumbria, England. It contains 42 listed buildings that are recorded in the National Heritage List for England. Of these, one is listed at Grade I, the highest of the three grades, one is at Grade II*, the middle grade, and the others are at Grade II, the lowest grade.  The parish contains the village of Temple Sowerby and the surrounding countryside.  Most of the listed buildings are in the village, and consist of houses and associated structures, farmhouses and farm buildings.  Also in the village and listed are a public house, a telephone kiosk and a maypole.  Outside the village, and listed, are Acorn Bank House and a water mill, both with associated structures.


Key

Buildings

Notes and references

Notes

Citations

Sources

Lists of listed buildings in Cumbria